Isabella of Bourbon-Parma (31 December 1741 – 27 November 1763) was a princess of Parma and infanta of Spain from the House of Bourbon-Parma as the daughter of Philip, Duke of Parma. She became an archduchess of Austria and princess of Bohemia and Hungary in 1760 by her marriage to Archduke Joseph of Austria, the future Joseph II, Holy Roman Emperor.

Although her husband loved her, she did not fully return his feelings and found more fulfillment in her (likely romantic, possibly sexual) relationship with her sister-in-law, Archduchess Maria Christina. The sudden loss of her mother, an arranged marriage in which she was unhappy, a court life that did not fit her, and a difficult birth followed closely by two miscarriages and another hard pregnancy all affected her mental health, leading to depression. She died at the age of twenty-one from smallpox.

Life

Birth and family 
Infanta Isabel María Luisa Antonieta of Spain was born on 31 December 1741 at Buen Retiro Palace in Madrid, Spain as the first child of Infante Philip of Spain and his wife, born Princess Marie-Louise-Élisabeth of France. Isabella's parents were first cousins once removed with an age difference of almost seven years, Élisabeth having been only twelve years old when she was married to then-nineteen-years-old Philip. She considered it beneath her, the firstborn daughter of the king of France, to marry anyone who was not a monarch or an heir apparent, and Philip was only the third son of his father. She had a contentious relationship with her mother-in-law Elisabeth Farnese, the de facto ruler of Spain.

Élisabeth was only fourteen when she gave birth to Isabella, and the difficult labour lasted for two days. Two months later, Philip left to fight in the War of the Austrian Succession, and did not see his daughter again until she was eight years old. Her mother showed little affection towards Isabella and probably found the baby to be a burden.

Early life in Madrid (1741–1748) 
For the first seven years of her life, Isabella was raised at the Madrid court of her paternal grandfather, Philip V, King of Spain. Her grandmother, Queen Elisabeth, loved her very much, reporting on her well-being and behaviour in her daily letters to her absent son, Philip. When she was three, Isabella started to throw tantrums. Her mother responded by chastising her severely, to the extent that Queen Elisabeth likened her behavior towards Isabella to a military drill, while agreeing that children need to be disciplined from an early age. This is the only recorded interaction between mother and daughter from this period; the letters never mention Élisabeth being warm towards her child but show her to have been impatient with her. She found Isabella to be stubborn and unbearable.

After she had been weaned, Isabella's care and education was entrusted to an aya or governess, the French-born María Catalina, Marchioness of Gonzalez (born Marie-Catherine de Bassecourt-Grigny, and later suo jure marchioness of Borghetto; 1693–1770), an austere widow always dressed in black. The marchioness retained a strong sense of etiquette and hierarchy from her previous employment as dame d'honneur to Barbara of Portugal. 

According to her unpublished autobiography titled , Isabella was an energetic and mischievous child, always loud, jumping, climbing, and falling, breaking expensive furniture and ornaments. Her favourite pastimes included chasing after butterflies, horseriding, and performing stunts on a rope, but she also liked to write, sing, and draw. Eventually, her aya took away ropes, horses, and swings in an attempt to better her conduct. 'What to do in this sad situation? [...] But I finally learned to be reasonable', she wrote. From then on, she entertained herself silently: 'My head was always in the clouds, occupying itself with a hundred thousand ideas at once.' Growing up as an only child until the age of ten with no playmates and under strict control, her childhood was characterised as 'lonely and austere' by her biographer Badinter. Still, she developed a close bond with her aya, inspiring the jealousy of her mother.

Isabella's education was focused on making her fulfill contemporary ideals for princesses. In 1746, a French envoy to Madrid complimented the 'bearing' of the four-year-old infanta, as well as the 'air of dignity with which she receives the world', saying that she already knows 'who she is, to whom she belongs, and what she must be one day'. He also found her to be 'very big' for her age and her face to be 'one of the most lovely ones'. At the same time, the envoy remarked on the coldness with which Isabella was treated by her mother.

Visit to Versailles (1749) 

Between 6 January and 7 October 1749, Isabella lived in Versailles when her mother visited her family. As the only granddaughter of Louis XV, who found her charming, she was pampered by her grandparents and aunts, surrounded by more attention and love than she had ever received. Treated with all the honour due to a granddaughter of France, she was lodged with the Marchioness of Gonzalez in the apartments of Louis Jean Marie de Bourbon, Duke of Penthièvre. The luxury and cheerfulness of the French court was a shock to the infanta after the more rigid court of Spain.

According to the customs of Versailles, the eight-year-old princess was old enough to participate in various court functions along with the royal family. She visited many theatres and operas and attented balls and concerts. It was recorded in the Mémoires of Paul d'Albert de Luynes, then bishop of Bayeux, that she did not seem to amuse herself too much at most performances, and was seen as 'timid'. At this time, Isabella was more comfortable speaking Spanish (which she had learned from her aya) than French, which she had always used with her mother and paternal grandmother.

Eventually, she overcame her shyness, adapted to her new surroundings, and started to enjoy her stay. She was also delighted by being treated as a French royal princess, as the king had ordered that she rank as high as her mother and aunts, and she was always saluted by the guard and seated in an identical armchair to that of the other princesses. Madame de Pompadour, her grandfather's maîtresse-en-titre also made a great impression on Isabella, who admired her when she acted in some of the plays performed at court so much that she decided to follow her example. One time, she even performed in the apartments of the dauphine, Maria Josepha of Saxony to general acclaim. After her stay in Versailles, she kept corresponding with her maternal family, and her primary language had become French.

Adolescence in Parma (1749–1760) 

Following the 1748 Treaty of Aix-la-Chapelle, her father became Duke of Parma, a title formerly belonging to the House of Farnese, his mother's family. This made Isabella a princess of Parma and a member of the new House of Bourbon-Parma. She arrived in her new home with her mother in on 20 November 1749.

Parma was impoverished and its Farnese palaces were in ruins. Whereas Isabella generally thought highly of Spaniards and the French, she found Italians to be 'ignorant of the art of thinking' and wanted to get out of the country as soon as she arrived. Her mother also complained of finding 'no talent' in a country 'where there is nothing', and of many positions in her household remaining unfilled. She was often reduced to tears by the poverty in which she found herself. Resenting her loss of status, she focused on arranging prestigious marriages for her children. She wanted to make Isabella either queen of Spain or Holy Roman empress, and visited Versailles two times to negotiate, once between August 1752 and October 1753, then in the summer of 1757, when she died. Both times, she left her husband and children in Parma.

Isabella's parents, reunited after almost ten years apart, had two children in 1751: Ferdinand on 20 January and Luisa on 9 December. Isabella seems not to have been jealous of the affection her mother showed to her two younger children, and enjoyed having company. During the long absences of Élisabeth, Isabella replaced her as the mother of the family, reporting on her siblings' well-being to their father, who also lived apart from his family for seven months every year in the Ducal Palace of Colorno to be closer to the best hunting grounds. Isabella sent short notes to him detailing the sleeping habits and teething of the two infants. Between November and April, Philip lived with his younger children in the Palazzo della Pilotta, while Isabella lived with her aya in the Palazzo del Giardino.

While Isabella surely also exchanged letters with her mother, these have been lost. It was around this time that two of her friends questioned Élisabeth on her coldness towards her eldest child. She replied that her 'character was too serious' to allow her to 'make a friend of [her] daughter', and that she believed that Isabella should be 'satisfied' with the amount of affection shown by her, especially because of her 'otherwise cold nature'. A few months later, she was officially urged by the Marshall of France, Adrien Maurice, Duke of Noailles, to show more tenderness and soften her usual dryness towards Isabella, as it was feared that her cold treatment could diminish the chances of a politically advantageous marriage. The French ambassador to Parma soon assured Noailles that more attention was being paid to Isabella since his letter, while Élisabeth protested her maternal love both to the Marshall and others, saying that 'all the world must see, I believe, how much I love her. For those who know me, it is certain'.

Education 
In Parma, Isabella's education continued under the Marquess of Gonzalez. In the summer of 1749, with her mother's support, her father engaged Pierre Cerou, a cultivated Frenchman who had written a successful comedy and had had some experience as a tutor to manage his property and instruct his daughter in history, literature, and French. In 1754, the Madrid court expressed concerns over the religiosity of the infanta's tutor, and demanded that he be replaced by a Jesuit. Élisabeth resisted, saying that a Jesuit would seek to control her son. In the end, the family agreed on a French member of the order, Thomas Fumeron, who fulfilled his role to the satisfaction of both courts. From Cerou's depart in April 1754, however, there was no tutor assigned to Isabella. In 1757 and 1758 respectively, a governor and a tutor were employed for Ferdinand, Auguste de Keralio, a soldier and scientist, and Abbot Bonnot de Condillac, a philosopher and close friend of Rousseau, Diderot, and d'Alembert.

Isabella was only officially instructed by his confessors, Fathers Fumeron and Belgrado, in the lives of saints only. Her education now focused on drawing, painting, and music, and she excelled at singing and playing the violin and the harpsichord. While there is no proof that he listened to the lectures by Keralion and Condillac, her biographer Badinter argues that her later knowledge on military theory, history, and Enlightenment ideals on education proves that she did so. During the negotiations for her marriage, Austrian observers reported Isabella to speak four languages, study sciences and maps, and follow military movements. In 1758, French historian Pierre-Jean Grosley visited Parma and described Isabella as 'one of the main wonders' of the city, as she had a 'marked talent' in all 'useful and pleasurable arts', as well as a solid knowledge of the world.

At this time, Isabella also certainly witnessed the cruelty of the two men, but especially the abbot, towards her brother: despite his progressive ideas about teaching through games and his reputation as a revolutionary pedagogue, he regularly beat Ferdinand with a rod or kicked him. In her Réflexions sur l'éducation, she condemned the way her brother had been brought up, clearly depicting both him and Condillac (despite never naming them). She maintained correspondence with Keralio in her adulthood, but barely ever mentioned the abbot.

Marriage

Background 
Maria Theresa, Holy Roman Empress followed a marriage policy intending to strengthen the relationship between the Houses of Bourbon and Habsburg. Influenced by Madame de Pompadour, Louis XV also decided to shift alliances and join forces with Austria against England and Prussia. Already in late 1751, State Chancellor Kaunitz, closest advisor of Maria Theresa, ordered the Austrian governor of Lombardy to go to Parma and report on Isabella, a prospective bride to either of the three sons of the empress. He was satisfied with the young girl's abilities, who danced with 'grace and skill', played musical instruments before him, already spoke French, Spanish, and Italian, and was just then starting to learn Latin.

When Maria Theresa's eldest son and heir, the Archduke Joseph came of age, he was presented with a list and portraits of marriageable princesses fitting his mother's goals. He chose the Infanta Isabella, who had been endorsed by the Austrian ambassador to France, the Count of Mercy-Argentau. He mostly relied on the opinions of his strong-willed mother and was not enthusiastic about marrying because of his low opinion of women. On the bride's side, negotiations were lead by her mother. The contract was finalised in the summer of 1759, during her last stay with her family at Versailles. Not long after, at thirty two, she caught smallpox and died in France, devastating her daughter, who might have become convinced at this time that she, too, would die young.

After the betrothal, the two courts decided to wait for some time so that the young couple could mature. The death of Élisabeth further delayed the plans. Meanwhile, Isabella started to learn German, devoting seven hours a day to the language. The governor of Lombardy was asked to prepare a detailed description of her character for the Viennese court. He praised Isabella as beautiful and kind, dignified but never affected. She apparently progressed well in German and liked reading but did not 'wish to appear a savant'. While she enjoyed playing music and liked balls to a degree, she cared little for card games, horseriding, or hunting, preferring brisk-paced walks. She distributed much of her income to the poor. The young woman was also anxious to please her future mother-in-law, the empress. All in all, it appears that Isabella prepared methodically for her future, paying attention to the political situation of the Habsburg monarchy and following its ongoing war with Prussia. To please her new family, she was ready to pretend and manipulate, if necessary.

Shortly before the wedding, Joseph wrote to a friend that he would do everything to win his bride's respect and trust, but that he considered it impossible for him to be 'agreeable, a lover', as that went against his nature which had never seen the point of being in love. Thoughts of his approaching wedding made him 'tremble' and melancholic.

Wedding 

Following a marriage by proxy, Isabella was sent with Joseph Wenzel I, Prince of Liechtenstein to Vienna in late 1760. While she was sorry to say goodbye to her family, she was happy to finally leave Parma. Maria Theresa refused to let anyone accompany her of her former staff. Publicly, Isabella behaved bravely, but when she was in private with her father, siblings, confessor, and aya for the last time, she cried much.

They travelled from Parma through the Alps, were greeted at the border by the widowed CountessErdődy, born Antónia Battyhány, her newly appointed Oberhofmeisterin. The company reached a castle near Vienna on 1 October, where they were received by her future father-in-law, Francis I, Holy Roman Emperor. They travelled together to Laxenburg castles where they met the rest of the imperial family. Isabella charmed almost all of them. Her groom, who had previously declared multiple times that he was more afraid of marriage than of battles, reportedly turned red upon seeing her and now could not wait for the wedding. While this might be an exaggeration, as Badinter argues, she certainly seduced Joseph quickly by her obedience and enabling him to feel intellectually superior to her.

The emperor, the empress, the archdukes and the archduchesses were also enchanted by her, one of them, Maria Christina writing that she did not know anyone as attractive as Isabella and that she had '''beautiful eyes and hair, a pretty mouth, and a delightfully shaped bosom'. Empress Maria Theresa judged her to be perfect, and it was generally agreed that she surpassed all expectations, being pretty and interesting despite not being a 'regular beauty' with her tan skin. The only person who disliked her was the eldest archduchess, Maria Anna, who had been the first lady of the court after the empress, but was now displaced by Isabella. She was also jealous of her being instantly adored by everyone, while she had always been slighted by her family.After arriving in Vienna, Isabella was accommodated in the Belvedere, separate from her new family in line with the strict etiquette forbidding brides from spending the night in the same house as their grooms. The wedding took place on 6 October. The guests went to the Augustinekirche  in 120 gilded carriages, riding among a cheering crowd, with musicians playing on every corner. The wedding was celebrated by the apostolic nuncio Vitaliano Borromeo.

Following the ceremony, there was a display of decorative lighting in Vienna at night, with almost three thousand lanterns burning between the Hofburg and the Stephansdom and the same amount of white wax candles in two lines, complete with many torches in the courtyard of the palace. At night, there was a public banquet at the Hofburg, where the pure golden tableware brought to Vienna as part of Isabella's dowry was used. The festival surrounding the wedding lasted for days and was commemorated in a series of paintings by Martin van Meytens, and can be viewed in the Hall of Ceremonies in Schönbrunn Palace as of 2023. All of this was organised despite the ongoing Seven Years' War draining the treasury, as Maria Theresa wished to distract attention and display the wealth of her empire.

 Married life and relationship with her husband 

While Joseph fell in love with Isabella and was an attentive husband, she never fully reciprocated his feelings. It quickly became apparent to everyone at court that while Joseph was deeply in love and showered his wife with signs of his affection, she remained reserved towards him. As an archduchess, it was her duty to produce an heir as quickly as possible, and everyone except for her was delighted when she became pregnant in late 1761. While not enthusiastic about pregnancy, she was still relieved that she did not disappoint her family. Although she worried that she did not have enough courage, she behaved in the expected way, with 'no sensitivity nor grimacing', as Maria Theresa wrote.Her pregnancy was especially difficult with many physical symptoms accompanied by depression and a lingering fear of death. This was only worsened by her inexperienced husband not understanding her problems. On 20 March 1762, she gave birth to a daughter, Archduchess Maria Theresa, named after her paternal grandmother. The court rejoiced at the birth of the imperial couple's first grandchild, and Joseph especially adored the baby. How Isabella felt about her child is unknown, but she only made one fleeting mention of her in her most intimate correspondence, and a friend said that her love for her child 'did not show much on the exterior'.

Soon, she was pregnant again, miscarrying in August 1762, and once more in January 1763. Maria Theresa was so worried by this that she counseled Joseph to wait for six months before trying for a son again, so that Isabella could recover. Her health suffered, worrying her family: she became extremely thin, had a continuous dry cough, and experienced pain in her sides. Her pregnancies and especially her miscarriages had deepened her depression, which in turn eroded her will to live. Her death anxiety was aggravated by the well-known risks of child birth.

Meanwhile, the love of her husband and mother-in-law for her only grew, and it seems that Isabella found a maternal figure in the empress. She seems to have hidden her independence and her revolutionary beliefs very well, being submissive towards both her husband and her mother-in-law.

 Relationship with Archduchess Maria Anna 

While most of her family loved and respected her, her relationship with her eldest sister-in-law, the Archduchess Maria Anna 'Marianna' only deteriorated. Isabella was beautiful, while everyone considered Marianna to be the least attractive among her sisters; she was lovely and charming, while Marianna was always ignored by her mother and siblings. The infanta was also very intelligent, and the sciences had been Marianna's refuge, something she shared with her father the Emperor Francis—who now also adored Isabella. The Spanish princess was even a better singer and violinist than the archduchess. Marianna considered Isabella a rival and greeted her coldly, hardly even extending her hand upon their first meeting.

Marianna's coldness, motivated by jealousy and a feeling of inferiority, deeply hurt Isabella and she decided not to trust her. She considered her a born schemer, a false, duplicitous, and hypocritical person. It seems like Marianna was the only one to at least suspect the lesbian love affair between Isabella and Marie, and she spied on them. In many letters by Isabella to Marie, she warned her to take care to keep their exchanges safe from Marianna, and her short dissertation titled The Lure of False Friendship was clearly about her. The two women exchanged hugs, kisses, and compliments in public. Their coldness, slowly turning into hostility, worsened the already distant relationship between Marianna and Joseph, and after Isabella's death he never forgave his sister for not loving his wife. As emperor and head of the family, he used his power to take revenge on her.

 Death and aftermath 
According to the custom introduced by Maria Theresa, the imperial court spent summers in Schönbrunn. In 1763, warm weather lasted so long that they only returned to the Hofburg on 14 November. In that year, it was recorded that Isabella did not want to travel back, even at that late time. She was heavily pregnant again, and reports of smallpox cases were made around Vienna. Only a few days after arriving in the city, on 18 November, Isabella developed a fever, and it soon became clear that she had caught the disease. The empress, who had nursed her previously, was begged to leave her bedroom, as she had not had the disease yet. After that, Joseph, Marianna, and Marie, her husband and his two sisters took care of her. The fever induced labour three months early, and on 22 November, she gave birth to a second daughter. The baby was baptised Maria Christina, as Isabella had requested, but died the same day.

Following the birth, Isabella was rarely conscious, but displayed a courage bordering on indifference. The odour coming from her bedroom was so strong that most people could not pass its door, but Joseph stayed by her side and took care of her without a break. On 26 November, the doctors had to tell him that Isabella was agonising, and she died on the next day at dawn, one month and three days before her 22nd birthday. As her body was still infectious, it was buried quickly without an autopsy or embalming, and placed in the Maria Theresa Vault of the Imperial Crypt. The tomb of her daughter Christina was placed beneath hers, and an unusually long mourning period of three months was ordered by the empress.

This tragedy, along with the death of smallpox of three or four of the imperial children and the suffering most family members underwent because of the disease contributed to Maria Theresa's 1768 decision to have younger members of the family variolated, and the subsequent acceptance of the practice in Austria.

 Impact on her husband 
Joseph was devastated by her death and never fully recovered. He nevertheless remarried on the insistence of his mother in 1765 to Maria Josepha of Bavaria. They lived in a miserable, loveless and childless marriage for two years before she also died of smallpox. He adored his only child, Maria Theresa, who died in 1770, at the age of 7, of pleurisy. While the love he had felt for his wife brought forward his more positive attributes, he closed off to the world after her death. He became even more sarcastic, easily irritable and often unreasonably aggressive than before their marriage.

 Writings 
Isabella left many writings from the time of her marriage, contemplating and analysing her life, her philosophy and the state of the world around her. In her Christian Reflections, which was published after Maria Theresa's death, she contemplated many religious questions and especially death. She was also planning a longer study titled On the Customs of Peoples, but could only write the part about Ancient Egyptians before her early death. In another, shorter dissertation, she summarised the Viennese court's efforts to join the Habsburg monarchy into world trade. Another short dissertation titled The Lure of False Friendship was clearly about her sister-law Marianna, with whom she had a hostile relationship.

 Réflexions sur l'éducation 
Her Reflections on Education was Isabella's rejection of the traditional upbringing of children, and specifically a condemnation of the cruel tutors of her brother, as well as of their parents who put them in charge. She charged parents with full responsibility over their children, implying that only lazy, indifferent, or weak people allowed strangers to raise their offspring. The most important tenet of her pedagogy was an avoidance of authoritarianism and corporal punishment. She defined authority as 'requiring everything without listening to the child', and ordering, punishing, and rewarding without ever showing satisfaction.

One of Isabella's main convictions was that the suppressing of the natural vivacity of children made them violent, stubborn, and harsh both immediately and in adulthood. Such treatment would also deprive them of their goodwill and confidence, leaving only a 'servile fear' of humiliation. Abusing parental authority leads, in her opinion, to children who think of themselves as slaves; to cope with this, they then became 'unfeeling and self-mocking'.

She further considered corporal punishment to be futile and even dangerous, a form of discipline originating in the hardened hearts and lowly feelings of educators and in the 'false belief' that humans are no better than animals. In Isabella's opinion, the use of violence against children only betrayed the adult's lack of understanding and talent in pedagogy. Painting a portrait of her brother Ferdinand without naming him, she concluded that hitting inspired in children hate and the desire to lie and 'avenge themselves'.

Instead of these methods, which she said had been gaining in popularity, she argued for kindness, 'almost unknown today' as it was regarded as a 'weakness, a failure of firmness and reason'.

 Sur le sort des princesses 
One of Isabella's writings is a study titled The Fate of Princesses, in which she wrote that princesses were the 'victim of the a minister's unfortunate policies', saying that it was for some public good. She criticised the idea of allying countries through marriages, saying that this cannot lead to a lasting alliance. In the end, she declared that a princess might be able to make her sad situation enviable by invoking the will of God and serving Him.

 Traité sur les hommes 

Isabella wrote a highly critical piece examining the status and behaviour of men in highly patriarchal contemporary European society, titled Traité sur les hommes ('Treaty on Men'). She argued that women were at least as good and capable as men if not better and mocked the male sex. Somewhat humorously, she described men as 'useless animals' only existing to 'do bad things, be impatient, and create confusion'. Based on her experiences, she concluded that men 'deprived of feelings, only loved themselves'. In her opinion, man is born to think but instead spend their lives 'with entertainment, yelling, playing heroes, running up and down, in other words, doing nothing but what flatters his vanity or requires no thought of him'.

She summarised why, in her opinion, men were nevertheless above women in society: firstly, so that their 'faults can make [women's] virtues shine brighter', secondly to become better every day, and, thirdly, 'to be endured in the world, from which, if they did not hold all power in their hands, they would be exiled entirely'. In conclusion, Isabella argued that the 'slavery' of women is caused by men sensing that women are superior to them.

 Conseils à Marie 
In what could be called her last will and testament, Isabella wrote a long letter to her sister-in-law and possible lover, Archduchess Maria Christina. This was a part of her preparation for death, as she was certain that she would die young and even looked forward to this. The Conseils à Marie ('Advice to Maria') consisted mostly of descriptions of their family members, including Maria Theresa and Joseph. In her view, her husband was 'not primarily emotional' and viewed usual expressions of love such as terms of endearment or hugs to be mere flattery or even hypocrisy. She described her father-in-law Emperor Francis as an honourable and good-hearted man on whom one can rely as a true friend, but someone who is prone to listening to bad advisors. Of Empress Maria Theresa, she wrote that 'a kind of mistrust and seeming coldness' is mixed in her love for her children. She stated that her death will not be a great loss for her mother-in-law, but will nevertheless cause her pain and that she will 'transfer all of the friendship she feels for [Isabella] to [Maria]'.

 Relationship with Archduchess Maria Christina 

Her sister-in-law, Archduchess Maria Christina 'Marie' or 'Mimi' was Isabella's best friend and closest, if not only confidante in Vienna. She was the third surviving child of the imperial couple, less than five months younger than Isabella, and the favourite child of the empress, intelligent and artistically inclined. The two quickly developed a very close relationship and spent so much time together that they earned a comparison with Orpheus and Eurydice. Despite living in the same place, they exchanged countless letters and small notes in French. Only those written by Isabella have survived (those of Marie were burned after her death) but even these amount to almost two hundred.

The two sisters-in-law liked each other from the time they met, but it seems that Isabella was also romantically and sexually attracted to Marie early on. The latter's feelings developed more gradually and remained more reserved. She was recovering from her love for Louis Eugene of Württemberg, after their relationship had been ended by Maria Theresa who considered him inferior to an archduchess. Soon after Isabella's arrival, in October or November 1760, she started to playfully pay court to Marie, writing that 'love, that cruel god, torment[ed her]' and that death would be 'surely sweet', except for not being able to love Marie anymore.

She also regularly portrayed the two of them as a heterosexual couple. In these depictions, Marie was Eurydice and her Orpheus; often, she used the names of couples from contemporary comedies, or called herself the lover ('amant') of Mimi.

The two women agreed on dates in hidden places and Isabella even wrote short notes to Marie during mass. They gifted each other contemporary toilets, chairs with a hole under which chamber pots could be placed, and Isabella commented that she hoped Marie would think of her each time she used it. If the weather prevented Joseph going on a scheduled hunt, the sisters-in-law cancelled their date in hurried, disappointed notes. They were also clearly worried to keep their relationship a secret, with Isabella writing a letter in March 1761 to remind Marie of her 'given word' not to ever talk of something, 'for there is nothing in the world as shameful as going against nature'.
While earlier historians dismissed the heated language of these letters as a fashionable, overly emotional expression of friendly love, later it became consensus that the two had a secret lesbian affair. Hans Bankl, who analysed the letters, concluded: 'The wife of the heir to the throne was in love, and, as she wrote, à la rage, to the point of madness. Only, not with her husband but with his sister'. Élisabeth Badinter, who published Isabella's letters, said that the desire to possess the object of one's love, the pain of being separated from her, an obsession with the beloved, jealousy, and dependency—seen as characteristics of romantic-sexual relationships both in the 18th century and since then—were all apparent in their correspondence.

It seems that Marie was the great love of Isabella's life, who was not romantically or sexually attracted to her husband. Marie looks to have been more reserved but did return her feelings. This inequality made Isabella unhappy in the relationship, while their shared perception of homosexuality as sinful led to feelings of guilt. sabella also felt guilty because she did not  return the love of her husband and properly fulfill her duty as a wife. This worsened her depression and convinced her that the only solution was death. She wrote to Marie that 'only the Almighty knows how gladly I would part with this life in which grievance is inflicted upon Him daily'.

 After Isabella's death 
There is no record of Marie's reaction to Isabella's death. She stayed next to her until the end, and took care of her daughter until the girl herself died at seven. According to a letter by Maria Theresa, Isabella entrusted her papers to her mother-in-law shortly before her death, saying that 'not everything was viewable' for Joseph. The empress then asked Countess Erdődy, Isabella's former Oberhofmeisterin'', to collect and burn all of Isabella's writings, saying that it would be her greatest service to the family.

In 1766, Marie married Prince Albert Casimir of Saxony. She was the only one of the empress' children to choose her own spouse and marry for love. After her death, a miniature of Isabella and her daughter Maria Theresa was found in her prayer book. On its back, she had written the date and cause of Isabella's death and that she was her best and truest friend who had 'lived as an angel and died as an angel'. The letters Isabella had written to her were also found among Marie's papers and read by her husband, then passed down in the family. Albert understood the letters as proof of the exceptional friendship between her beloved wife and an unpararelled princess.

Personality and appearance 

Isabella was a very intelligent and well-educated woman especially interested in philosophy, morality, music, history, physics, and metaphysics. She was also artistically inclined, painted, drew, sang, played the violin (something rare even among men), and wrote poems and studies. She studied mechanics, worked on various machinery, and enjoyed doing sports. The imperial court and even her husband, who had previously viewed chatting with women an empty pastime, considered her a witty conversationalist. Despite her shy and reserved nature, she managed to fit in everywhere and be liked by most people. She observed others consciously and analysed their personalities.

When her best friend and possible lover, Archduchess Maria Christina wrote a description of Isabella, she mentioned being biased in favour of those she loved and changing her opinions reluctantly among her negative traits. She also stated that Isabella liked to 'torture' people, but that once she had reached her goal and upset them she was devastated.

Her physical appearance was the opposite of fashionable among noble ladies: she had olive skin and short hair.

Depression 
Isabella was melancholic, as depression was known in the 18th century. Despite her usual liveliness and love of sports, she had sudden periods of being unable to move and sitting in her place staring in front of herself. It has been suggested by Ursula Tamussino that her problems, probably a form of bipolar disorder, were hereditary as both of her grandfathers and her father showed similar symptoms. Her mother's death also had a horrible effect on her, and she soon became convinced that she would not live for more than four years from then. Burdened by her marriage, difficult pregnancies and homosexual desires, she became suicidal. She admitted in a letter that she would feel 'great temptation' to commit suicide if it was not forbidden by the church. As reasons for this she listed that she felt she was good for nothing, only did bad things, and saw no way for her salvation. By 1763, her yearning for death reached the extent that she declared to have heard a voice telling her that the end is near, which put her in a 'gentle, peaceful, festive mood', encouraged her to do anything and gave her a 'mysterious power over [herself]'.

Issue 
Isabella had four known pregnancies during the three years of her marriage to Archduke Joseph. Two of these ended in a miscarriage and the two live births produced two daughters, only one of whom survived infancy and neither of whom lived to adulthood.

Ancestry

References

Sources

Journals

Books

Web pages 

 
 
 
 Rice, 'Women in Love: Gluck's Orfeo as a Source of Romantic Consolation in Vienna, Paris, and Stockholm
 

1741 births
1763 deaths
Princesses of Bourbon-Parma
House of Habsburg-Lorraine
18th-century LGBT people
Spanish LGBT people
I
Infectious disease deaths in Austria
Deaths from smallpox
Burials at the Imperial Crypt
Daughters of monarchs